Great Mound may refer to:
Great Mound (Anderson, Indiana), at Mounds State Park, listed on the NRHP in Indiana
Great Mound (Marietta, Ohio), at Mound Cemetery, aka "Conus" or "Mound Cemetery Mound" (NRHP site #73001549), listed on the NRHP in Washington County, Ohio
Great Mound (Middletown, Ohio), listed on the NRHP in Ohio